Mecas pergrata is a species of beetle in the family Cerambycidae. It was described by Thomas Say in 1824. It is known from Mexico and the United States.

References

Saperdini
Beetles described in 1824